Meraka Chamavaram is a village in Rowthulapudi Mandal, Kakinada district in the state of Andhra Pradesh in India.

Geography 

Demographics 
 India census, Meraka Chamavaram had a population of 1,675, out of which 826 were male and 849 were female. Population of children below 6 years of age were 196. The literacy rate of the village is 56.86%.

References 

Villages in Rowthulapudi mandal